The 2018 Nevada gubernatorial election took place on November 6, 2018, to elect the next governor of Nevada. Incumbent Republican Governor Brian Sandoval was ineligible to run for re-election, due to the absolute two-term limit established by the Nevada Constitution. Nevada is one of eight U.S. states (or nine U.S. states and territory) that prohibits its governors or any other state and territorial executive branch officials from serving more than two terms, even if they are nonconsecutive.

The candidate filing deadline was March 16, 2018 and the primary election was held on June 12, 2018. The Republican nominee was Adam Laxalt and the Democratic nominee was Steve Sisolak. Sisolak won the election, becoming the first Democrat to be elected Governor of Nevada since Bob Miller won his second full term in 1994, and the first non-incumbent Democrat to win since 1982.

Republican primary

Candidates

Nominated
 Adam Laxalt, Nevada Attorney General

Eliminated in primary
 William W. Boyd, small business owner
 Stephanie Carlisle, businesswoman
 Jared Fisher, small business owner
 Dan Schwartz, Nevada State Treasurer and candidate for NV-04 in 2012 (endorsed Laxalt)

Declined
 Mark Amodei, U.S. Representative (ran for re-election and won)
 Joe Heck, former U.S. Representative and nominee for U.S. Senate in 2016
 Dean Heller, U.S. Senator (endorsed Laxalt and ran for re-election and lost)
 Steve Hill, former executive director of the Nevada Governor's Office of Economic Development
 Mark Hutchison, lieutenant governor (endorsed Laxalt)
 Ron Knecht, Nevada State Controller (ran for re-election and lost)
 Brian Krolicki, former lieutenant governor

Endorsements

Polling

Results

Democratic primary

Candidates

Nominated
 Steve Sisolak, chair of the Clark County Commission

Eliminated in primary
 Kyle Chamberlain, activist and photographer
 Chris Giunchigliani, vice-chair of the Clark County Commission and candidate for Mayor of Las Vegas in 2011

Declined
 Aaron Ford, Majority Leader of the Nevada Senate (ran for Attorney General and won)
 Vince Juaristi, consultant and former gubernatorial aide
 Tick Segerblom, state senator (ran for Clark County Commission and won)
 Dina Titus, U.S. Representative for Nevada's 1st congressional district and nominee for governor in 2006 (endorsed Sisolak and ran for re-election and won)

Endorsements

Polling

Results

Independents

Declared
 Ryan Bundy, rancher

Endorsements

General election

Predictions

Endorsements

Polling

with Chris Giunchigliani

Results
While Sisolak only won two of the state’s counties, those two counties account for more than 80% of the total state population. His overwhelming victory in Clark County, home of Las Vegas, and his narrow victory in Washoe County were enough to pull him over the finish line. Sisolak became the first Democrat to be elected Governor of Nevada since Bob Miller’s successful re-election bid in 1994.

Results by county

While Laxalt won 15 of Nevada's county-level jurisdictions (14 counties and the independent city of Carson City), Sisolak carried the two largest, Clark (home to Las Vegas) and Washoe (home to Reno). Sisolak ultimately prevailed by winning his home county, Clark, by over 86,000 votes, double his statewide margin of 39,700 votes.

See also
 2018 Nevada elections

Notes

References

External links
Candidates at Vote Smart
Candidates at Ballotpedia

Official campaign websites
Russell Best (IA) for Governor
Ryan Bundy (I) for Governor
Adam Laxalt (R) for Governor
Jared Lord (L) for Governor
Steve Sisolak (D) for Governor

2018 Nevada elections
2018
2018
2018 United States gubernatorial elections